Nikhil Srivastava is an associate professor of Mathematics at University of California, Berkeley. In July 2014, he was named a recipient of the Pólya Prize with Adam Marcus and Daniel Spielman.

Early life and education
Nikhil Srivastava was born New Delhi, India. He attended Union College in Schenectady, New York, graduating summa cum laude with a Bachelor of Science degree in mathematics and computer science in 2005. He received a PhD in computer science from Yale University in 2010 (his dissertation was called "Spectral Sparsification and Restricted Invertibility").

Awards
In 2013, together with Adam Marcus and Daniel Spielman, he provided a positive solution to the Kadison–Singer problem, a result that was awarded the 2014 Pólya Prize.

He gave an invited lecture at the International Congress of Mathematicians in 2014. He jointly won the 2021 Michael and Sheila Held Prize along with two others for solving long-standing questions on the Kadison-Singer problem and on Ramanujan graphs.

References

Year of birth missing (living people)
Living people
Researchers in geometric algorithms
University of California, Berkeley faculty
Union College (New York) alumni
Yale University alumni